The Haldane effect is a property of hemoglobin first described by John Scott Haldane, within which oxygenation of blood in the lungs displaces carbon dioxide from hemoglobin, increasing the removal of carbon dioxide. Consequently, oxygenated blood has a reduced affinity for carbon dioxide. Thus, the Haldane effect describes the ability of hemoglobin to carry increased amounts of carbon dioxide (CO2) in the deoxygenated state as opposed to the oxygenated state. A high concentration of CO2 facilitates dissociation of oxyhemoglobin.

Carbaminohemoglobin
Carbon dioxide travels through the blood in three different ways. One of these ways is by binding to amino groups, creating carbamino compounds. Amino groups are available for binding at the N-terminals and at side-chains of arginine and lysine residues in hemoglobin. When carbon dioxide binds to these residues carbaminohemoglobin is formed. This amount of carbaminohemoglobin formed is inversely proportional to the amount of oxygen attached to hemoglobin. Thus, at lower oxygen saturation, more carbaminohemoglobin is formed. These dynamics explain the relative difference in hemoglobin's affinity for carbon dioxide depending on oxygen levels known as the Haldane effect.

Buffering
Histidine residues in hemoglobin can accept and act as buffers. Deoxygenated hemoglobin is a better proton acceptor than the oxygenated form.

In red blood cells, the enzyme carbonic anhydrase catalyzes the conversion of dissolved carbon dioxide to carbonic acid, which rapidly dissociates to bicarbonate and a free proton:
CO2 + H2O → H2CO3 → H+ + HCO3−
By Le Chatelier's principle, anything that stabilizes the proton produced will cause the reaction to shift to the right, thus the enhanced affinity of deoxyhemoglobin for protons enhances synthesis of bicarbonate and accordingly increases capacity of deoxygenated blood for carbon dioxide. The majority of carbon dioxide in the blood is in the form of bicarbonate. Only a very small amount is actually dissolved as carbon dioxide, and the remaining amount of carbon dioxide is bound to hemoglobin.

In addition to enhancing removal of carbon dioxide from oxygen-consuming tissues, the Haldane effect promotes dissociation of carbon dioxide from hemoglobin in the presence of oxygen. In the oxygen-rich capillaries of the lung, this property causes the displacement of carbon dioxide to plasma as low-oxygen blood enters the alveolus and is vital for alveolar gas exchange.

The general equation for the Haldane Effect is:
H+ + HbO2  H+Hb + O2;
However, this equation is confusing as it reflects primarily the Bohr effect. The significance of this equation lies in realizing that oxygenation of Hb promotes dissociation of H+ from Hb, which shifts the bicarbonate buffer equilibrium towards CO2 formation; therefore, CO2 is released from RBCs.

Clinical significance
In patients with lung disease, lungs may not be able to increase alveolar ventilation in the face of increased amounts of dissolved CO2.

This partially explains the observation that some patients with emphysema might have an increase in PaCO2 (partial pressure of arterial dissolved carbon dioxide) following administration of supplemental oxygen even if content of CO2 stays equal.

See also
Bohr effect
Chloride shift

References

External links
 

Hematology
Hemoproteins
Respiratory physiology